Toshio Yamamoto is a Japanese mountaineer who summited Mount Everest in 2000 at the age of 63. This was noted in world news for becoming the oldest person up to that time to summit Mount Everest. Toshio summited Mount Everest on May 19, 2000, via the North Col, with Tosio Nakamura as the expedition team leader.

Toshio broke the record during a period of intense competition for oldest summiter, taking the record from Lev Sariskov, who had summited Everest in 1999 at the age of 61. By the time Toshio made his summit in 2000, over 800 had summited and 180 had died since 1953, according to The Washington Post. The record was broken almost every year during this period, Toshio surpassing Lev Sariskov from the previous year and Sherman Bull in turn breaking Toshio's record the next year, and this record was broken several more times in the following decade. By 2013 the record was set at 80, by Yuichiro Miura, who had also set a record of 70 in 2003 and was the first person known to ski down Everest in 1970, as documented in the film The Man Who Skied Down Everest.

Age at time of summiting in year (oldest at time of summiting Mount Everest)
Lev Sariskov, age 61, 1999
Toshio Yamamoto, age 63, 2000
Sherman Bull, age 64, 2001 
Tomiyasu Ishikawa, 65, 2002  
Yuichiro Miura, age 70, 2003
Takao Arayama, age 70 (three days older than Miura), 2006 
Katsusuke Yanagisawa, 71 years and 63 days, 2007
Min Bahadur Sherchan, age 76, 2008
Yuichiro Miura, age 80, 2013

In 2008 Yuichiro Miura summited again at age 75, but was beaten by Min Bahadur Sherchan, summiting at age 76.

See also
List of Mount Everest records
List of 20th-century summiters of Mount Everest
Yuichiro Miura (Summited at age 80)

References

External links
Misc. Everest age records up to about 2002

Japanese summiters of Mount Everest
Japanese mountain climbers